Adam Musah (born 7 July 2002) is a Ghanaian professional footballer who plays as a forward for Ghana Division One side Nzema Kotoko on loan from Ghanaian Premier League side Aduana Stars.

Career

Aduana Stars 
Musah started his career with Dormaa-based side Aduana Stars. He was promoted to the senior side during the 2019–20 Ghana Premier League season. On 19 January 2019, he made his debut after coming on at half time for Hafiz Adams in a 2–0 victory over Legon Cities.

He played 4 matches before the league was brought to a halt as a result of the COVID-19 pandemic. He made the team's squad list for 2020–21 Ghana Premier League season, he made 4 league appearances during the first round of the season, including playing the full 90 minutes in a 2–1 loss to Medeama SC on 9 January 2021, with Isaac Agyenim Boateng scoring a brace in the process. On 7 February 2021, he came on in the 85th minute to replace Yahaya Mohammed in a 1–0 victory over West African Football Academy (WAFA).

Nzema Kotoko (loan) 
On 17 March 2021, after playing the first round of the 2020–21 season with Aduana Stars, he was sent on a loan to Ghana Division One League side Nzema Kotoko for the remainder of the season.

References

External links 

 

Living people
Association football forwards
2002 births
Ghanaian footballers
Aduana Stars F.C. players
Ghana Premier League players